= Arefa Tehsin =

Indian writer

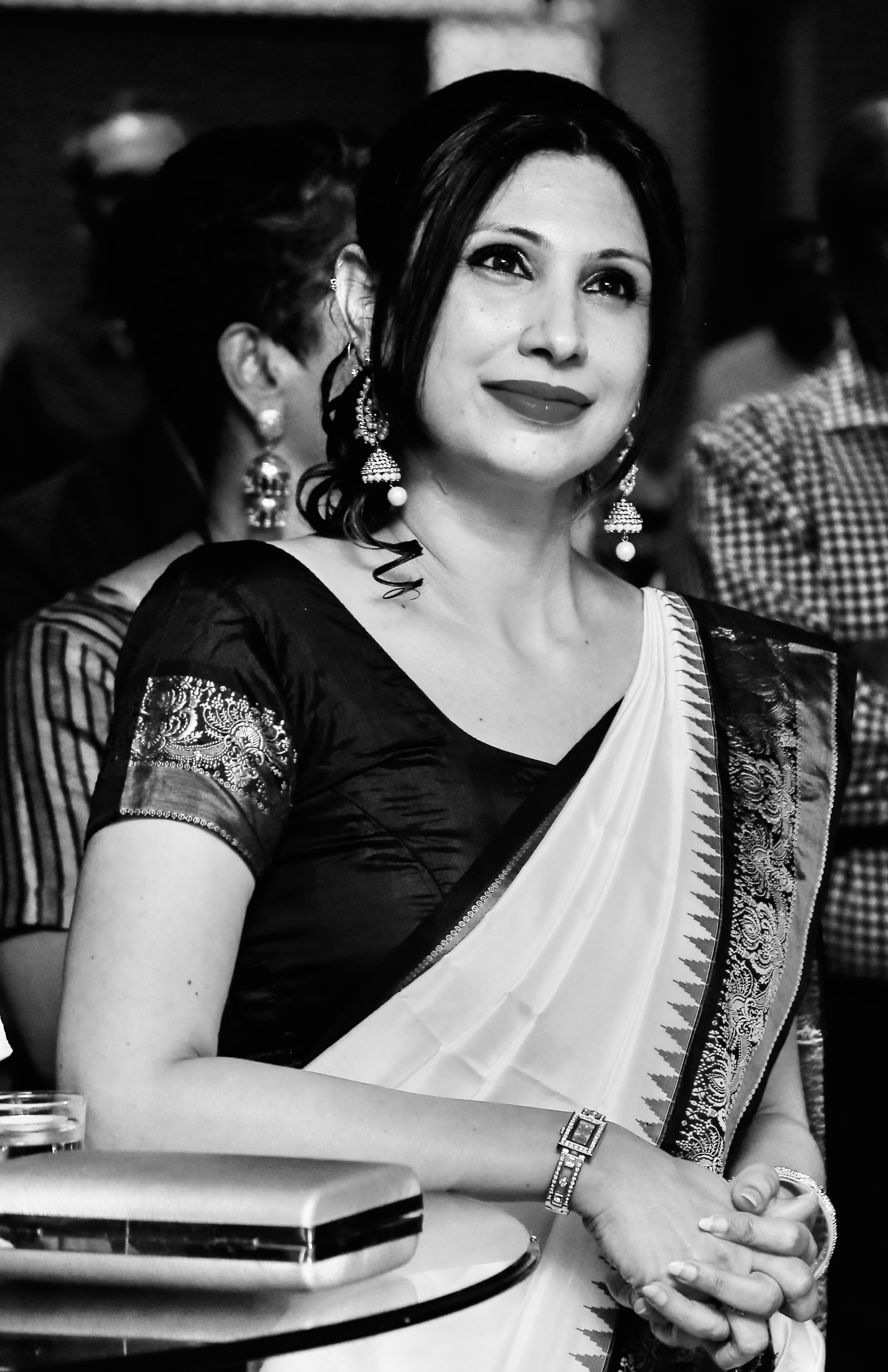
- Born: Udaipur, Rajasthan
- Occupations: Writer and columnist
- Writing career
- Years active: 2010–present
- Genres: Children’s literature, literary fiction, nature writing
- Notable works: The Witch in the Peepul Tree; Wild in the Backyard; The Great Indian Safari
- Website: arefatehsin.com

Arefa Tehsin is an Indian author, naturalist and columnist. She writes fiction for children, young adults and adults.

Her debut adult novel, The Witch in the Peepul Tree, was super-shortlisted for the 2024 Asian Prize for Fiction.

She has written more than twenty books including Wild in the Backyard (2018), The Witch in the Peepul Tree (2023) and The Great Indian Safari (2025). Her columns are published in national dailies like Hindustan Times, The Hindu and The Indian Express.

== Early life and education ==
Tehsin grew up in Udaipur, Rajasthan. She is the daughter of naturalist Dr. Raza H. Tehsin. Arefa’s childhood days were spent treading jungles with her father, which deeply influenced her as an author.

== Career ==
Tehsin began writing columns and features for newspapers like The Hindu, The Indian Express, Outlook Money and Hindustan Times. She also served as the honorary wildlife warden of Udaipur district.

In 2014, she co-authored The Land of the Setting Sun & Other Nature Tales with her father, which was described as a “must-read for young readers” by The Better India.

Her young adult fantasy novel, Iora and the Quest of Five, was highlighted in The Indian Express for its environmental themes.

In 2023, HarperCollins India published her debut adult novel, The Witch in the Peepul Tree, a historical mystery set in 1950s Udaipur. The book is being translated into Sinhalese and is also being adapted for broadcast in multiple Indian languages. The book was included in the super-shortlist, the “Asian Trio”, for the 2024 Asian Prize for Fiction.

The novel received coverage from the Press Trust of India following its shortlisting for the 2024 Asian Prize for Fiction.

The Witch in the Peepul Tree was featured in The Indian Express’s June 2023 book recommendations.The novel’s shortlist recognition was also covered by Scroll.in.

In 2025, Puffin Penguin published The Great Indian Safari, an illustrated introduction to India’s wildlife and ecosystems for children.

== Works ==
=== Selected books ===
- Steed of the Jungle God
- The Globetrotters
- The Land of the Setting Sun & Other Nature Tales (2014, with Raza H. Tehsin)
- Wild in the Backyard (2018)
- Iora and the Quest of Five (2022)
- The Witch in the Peepul Tree (2023)
- The Great Indian Safari (2025)

== Selected awards ==
- The Great Indian Safari – shortlisted for the 2025 Atta Galatta: Bangalore Literature Festival Book Prize.
- The Witch in the Peepul Tree – included in the super-shortlist for the 2024 Asian Prize for Fiction.
- The Chirmi Chasers – shortlisted for the 2021 Neev Book Award.

== Personal life ==
Tehsin divides her time between Sri Lanka and India.
